Herbert White may refer to:

 Herbert White (cricketer) (1830–1863), English cricketer and clergyman
 Herbert White (footballer) (born 1907), Australian rules football player
 Herbert S. White (born 1927), American professor of library science
 Herbert Thirkell White (1855–1931), Lieutenant Governor of the British Indian province of Burma
 Herb White, basketball player
 Herbert "Whitey" White, manager of Whitey's Lindy Hoppers

See also
Bert White (disambiguation)